Below are lists of films produced in Hong Kong in the 2020s.

List of Hong Kong films of 2020
List of Hong Kong films of 2021
List of Hong Kong films of 2022
List of Hong Kong films of 2023

See also
List of films set in Hong Kong

External links
 IMDB list of Hong Kong films

Films
Hong Kong